Lord Changping (昌平君; died 223 BC) was a Chinese monarch and politician who remained as an important military commander and lord of Qin, who later departed from the state of Qin and went to the state of Chu where he became the last king of Chu (223 BC) in the last days of the Chinese Warring States period.

Accounts in the Records of the Grand Historian
The deeds of Lord Changping was mainly recorded in Vol. 6: Annals of Qin Shi Huang of the Records of the Grand Historian.

In 238 BC, in the State of Qin, a pseudo-eunuch Lao Ai entered into a relationship with Queen Dowager Zhao and plotted against King Zheng of Qin (who would later ascend to Shi Huang, the First Emperor):
The king found out this fact and ordered the chancellor (Lü Buwei) to let Lord Changping and  lead soldiers and attack Lao Ai. They battled at Xianyang (the capital of Qin) and killed hundreds [of the rebels]. [For this deed,] they all received the peerage. Also, all eunuchs who battled [against Lao Ai] received one higher peerage than before.
Although Lao Ai fled from this battle, he was ultimately captured and executed.

In 226 BC, Lord Changping moved to Ying (the capital of Chu).

In 224 BC, King Zheng of Qin appointed General Li Xin and his vice-commander General Meng Tian in charge of a 200,000 strong army with the task of conquering the Chu state.  After some initial success, the invasion was successfully stopped by both Lord Changping and General , when they managed to wipe out most of the Qin army, killing thousands, as well as some of their top commanders.  After this defeat, the Qin King put General Wang Jian in charge of a 600,000 Qin army to finally achieve the conquest of Chu.  Wang went on to captured its king (Fuchu) and capital. The remnants, however, continued to resist by adopting Lord Changping as their new king:   , general of Jing (another name of Chu), adopted Lord Changping as the king of Jing and resisted against Qin at Huainan. In the 24th year (223 BC), commander in chief General Wang Jian and his vice-commander General Meng Wu assaulted Chu and after some major battles they defeated the Chu army led by Lord Changping and General Xiang Yan. Lord Changping was killed by Meng Wu and Xiang Yan finally put an end to himself.

In contrast, Vol. 40: House of Chu records Fuchu as the last king of Chu and does not mention Lord Changping. Furthermore, the order of events is utterly reversed compared to the accounts in Vol. 6; the army of Qin killed General Xiang Yan in 224 BC and then captured Fuchu in 223 BC.

Other references
His name was not recorded but some archaeologists associate him with a prime minister Shao of Qin.

According to the modern historian Li Kaiyuan, his given name was Qi, his ancestral name Mi and his lineage name Xiong were those of the kings of Chu. He was the son of King Kaolie of Chu. Lord Changping's three predecessors were all his brothers: King You, King Ai, and Fuchu. He died from an arrow wound.

In popular culture
In the manga series Kingdom, he is one of the finest strategists in China and a mighty warrior as well (known under the spelling "Shou Hei Kun"), he holds the position of 'Chief of Military Affairs' acting as the 'Supreme Commander' of the entire Qin military, he's also the 'Headmaster of the Strategist Academy' (where he has taught Meng Tian [Mou Ten], Meng Yi [Mou Ki] and Heliao Diao [Karyo Ten]), initially he was one of the "Four Pillars of Lü [Ryo]", and in the court he later became the "Chancellor of the Right", then joining with the King's faction, which resulted in the Lü Buwei's [Ryo Fui] disgrace, consequently causing the King to gain the complete dominance over the state of Qin, he's one of the key members providing assistance to king Yíng Zhèng (Ei Sei) towards the unification of China.
 When he was young he was a brilliant student under  (Ko Shou), the only pure natural strategist of the former "Qin Six Great Generals".

In Yasuhisa Hara's one shot manga written before Kingdom was serialised, he was referred as a former Qin official and prime minister, until he snapped and defected to Chu when his former homeland was going to be invaded and he cannot pass any tactics to Ying Zheng. He was killed when his former friend, a Qin general Meng Wu fought him.

References

223 BC deaths
Assassinated Chinese politicians
3rd-century BC Chinese monarchs
3rd-century BC murdered monarchs
Deaths by arrow wounds
Generals from Shaanxi
Monarchs of Chu (state)
People from Xianyang
Qin dynasty generals
Year of birth unknown